Papilio thuraui is a species of swallowtail butterfly from the genus Papilio that is found in Tanzania, Malawi, Zambia and the Republic of the Congo.

Description
Blue median band absent and a complete series of blue submarginal spots in both wings. Both wings above black-brown without median band, but with blue submarginal 
spots and the forewing also in the middle between the apex of the cell and the distal margin with three small blue spots in cellules 3, 4 and 6; forewing beneath with four large yellowish submarginal spots in cellules 1 b—4. — German East Africa: Ubena.

Original description

Subspecies
P. t. thuraui (southern Tanzania, northern Malawi)
P. t. cyclopis Rothschild & Jordan, 1903 . (Malawi, Zambia)
P. t. occidua Storace, 1951  (Republic of the Congo, Malawi, north-eastern Zambia)
P. t. heathi (Hancock, 1984)  (Malawi)
P. t. ngorongoro (Hancock, 1984) (northern Tanzania)
P. t. viphya (Hancock, 1984) (Malawi)

Biology

The larvae feed on Toddalia asiatica.

Taxonomy
Papilio thuraui belongs to a clade called the nireus species group with 15 members. The pattern is black with green or blue bands and spots. The butterflies, although called swallowtails, lack tails with the exception of Papilio charopus and Papilio hornimani. The clade members are:

Papilio aristophontes Oberthür, 1897
Papilio nireus Linnaeus, 1758
Papilio charopus Westwood, 1843
Papilio chitondensis de Sousa & Fernandes, 1966
Papilio chrapkowskii Suffert, 1904
Papilio chrapkowskoides Storace, 1952
Papilio desmondi van Someren, 1939
Papilio hornimani Distant, 1879
Papilio interjectana Vane-Wright, 1995
Papilio manlius Fabricius, 1798
Papilio microps Storace, 1951
Papilio sosia Rothschild & Jordan, 1903
Papilio thuraui Karsch, 1900
Papilio ufipa Carcasson, 1961
Papilio wilsoni Rothschild, 1926

Biogeographic realm
This species is located in the Afrotropical realm.

See also
Albertine Rift montane forests
Congolian forests

References

Carcasson, R.H. (1960). The Swallowtail Butterflies of East Africa (Lepidoptera, Papilionidae). Journal of the East Africa Natural History Society pdf Key to East Africa members of the species group, diagnostic and other notes and figures. (Permission to host granted by The East Africa Natural History Society)

External links
Global Butterfly Information System Images
Butterfly corner Images from Naturhistorisches Museum Wien
External images R C Dening collection
Globis images

thuraui
Butterflies described in 1900
Butterflies of Africa
Taxa named by Ferdinand Karsch